The Heath Baby Bullet was a racing aircraft built during the interwar period.

Design and development
The Baby Bullet started as a single place, mid-winged, open cockpit, conventional landing gear equipped aircraft. A Bristol Cherub engine was first used, followed by a Continental A-40.

Operational history
1928 National Air Races
1934 National Air Races - Bob Chonsky renamed his plane the "Angell Whistler" and crashed with a failed landing gear.

Variants
1932 Single main wheel version

Specifications (Baby Bullet)

References

Racing aircraft